Peter J. Cooper,  is a British psychopathologist and academic. He is Professor of Psychopathology at the University of Reading. He was elected a fellow of the British Academy in 2016. Cooper is a specialist in intergenerational transmission of psychopathology, child cognitive and socio-emotional development in the developing world, and the development evaluation and dissemination of parenting interventions.

Selected works

References 

Living people
Fellows of the British Academy
Academics of the University of Reading
Psychopathologists
Year of birth missing (living people)